Adam Kingsley (born 20 August 1975) is a former Australian rules footballer and senior coach of the Greater Western Sydney Giants in the Australian Football League (AFL).

Playing career

Port Adelaide
Originally from Eastern Ranges, he was playing for the Essendon Football Club's reserves team, before being recruited by Port Adelaide. Debuting in the Port Adelaide Football Club's inaugural 1997 AFL side, Kingsley was known as a consistent defender/midfielder.		

He struggled in 2003, coming close to being delisted, but improved his form and cemented a spot during 2004, being a premiership player that year after working his way back into the side.		

2005 saw another consistent season from Kingsley, however, he played just five games in 2006, which cast doubts over his career. In his fifth game in Round 22, he injured his anterior cruciate ligament, which forced his retirement. He said in The Age on 12 September 2006, that he had hoped to continue playing in 2007 before the injury.		

Kingsley played a total of 170 games and kicked a total of 47 goals for Port Adelaide from 1997 until 2006, and was a member of the Port Adelaide premiership side in 2004.

Coaching career

Assistant coaching (2007–2022)
In 2007, Kingsley became an assistant coach at Port Adelaide, a position in which he stayed in until the end of 2010. He then joined St Kilda at the end of the 2010 season as an assistant coach, staying at the club until 2018 before joining  as an assistant coach in 2019.

Greater Western Sydney senior coach (2023–present)
Kingsley replaced GWS caretaker senior coach Mark McVeigh, who coached the Giants after Leon Cameron stepped down in the middle of the 2022 season.

Media work
In March 2006, Kingsley won Australia's Brainiest Footballer, a Network Ten quiz show special. He donated the $20,000 that he won to the McGuinness-McDermott Foundation (run by former Adelaide footballers Tony McGuinness and Chris McDermott).

Statistics

|-
|- style="background-color: #EAEAEA"
! scope="row" style="text-align:center" | 1997
|style="text-align:center;"|
| 29 || 12 || 2 || 4 || 114 || 69 || 183 || 40 || 9 || 0.2 || 0.3 || 9.5 || 5.8 || 15.3 || 3.3 || 0.8 || 0
|-
! scope="row" style="text-align:center" | 1998
|style="text-align:center;"|
| 29 || 22 || 10 || 9 || 275 || 131 || 406 || 82 || 32 || 0.5 || 0.4 || 12.5 || 6.0 || 18.5 || 3.7 || 1.5 || 0
|- style="background-color: #EAEAEA"
! scope="row" style="text-align:center" | 1999
|style="text-align:center;"|
| 29 || 23 || 3 || 5 || 310 || 125 || 435 || 71 || 26 || 0.1 || 0.2 || 13.5 || 5.4 || 18.9 || 3.1 || 1.1 || 8
|-
! scope="row" style="text-align:center" | 2000
|style="text-align:center;"|
| 29 || 15 || 4 || 6 || 187 || 52 || 239 || 56 || 18 || 0.3 || 0.4 || 12.5 || 3.5 || 15.9 || 3.7 || 1.2 || 0
|- style="background-color: #EAEAEA"
! scope="row" style="text-align:center" | 2001
|style="text-align:center;"|
| 29 || 21 || 0 || 1 || 236 || 126 || 362 || 117 || 29 || 0.0 || 0.0 || 11.2 || 6.0 || 17.2 || 5.6 || 1.4 || 0
|-
! scope="row" style="text-align:center" | 2002
|style="text-align:center;"|
| 29 || 20 || 5 || 1 || 216 || 114 || 330 || 67 || 21 || 0.3 || 0.1 || 10.8 || 5.7 || 16.5 || 3.4 || 1.1 || 0
|- style="background-color: #EAEAEA"
! scope="row" style="text-align:center" | 2003
|style="text-align:center;"|
| 29 || 12 || 1 || 1 || 112 || 55 || 167 || 51 || 18 || 0.1 || 0.1 || 9.3 || 4.6 || 13.9 || 4.3 || 1.5 || 3
|-
! scope="row" style="text-align:center;" | 2004
|style="text-align:center;"|
| 29 || 19 || 8 || 2 || 203 || 111 || 314 || 92 || 32 || 0.4 || 0.1 || 10.7 || 5.8 || 16.5 || 4.8 || 1.7 || 4
|- style="background-color: #EAEAEA"
! scope="row" style="text-align:center" | 2005
|style="text-align:center;"|
| 29 || 21 || 14 || 5 || 264 || 121 || 385 || 102 || 36 || 0.7 || 0.2 || 12.6 || 5.8 || 18.3 || 4.9 || 1.7 || 0
|-
! scope="row" style="text-align:center" | 2006
|style="text-align:center;"|
| 29 || 5 || 0 || 1 || 40 || 20 || 60 || 15 || 6 || 0.0 || 0.2 || 8.0 || 4.0 || 12.0 || 3.0 || 1.2 || 0
|- class="sortbottom"
! colspan=3| Career
! 170
! 47
! 35
! 1957
! 924
! 2881
! 693
! 227
! 0.3
! 0.2
! 11.5
! 5.4
! 16.9
! 4.1
! 1.3
! 15
|}

References

External links

Port Adelaide Football Club players
Port Adelaide Football Club Premiership players
Port Adelaide Football Club players (all competitions)
John Cahill Medal winners
1975 births
Living people
Eastern Ranges players
Australian rules footballers from Victoria (Australia)
One-time VFL/AFL Premiership players